Am I Cool or What? is an album featuring songs inspired by the American comic strip Garfield created by Jim Davis. It was released on July 3, 1991, by GRP Records in cassette tape and compact disc format. The genre is primarily R&B and contemporary jazz. The album features appearances by influential contributors to the genre, including B. B. King and The Temptations. It peaked at number 23 on the Billboard charts for top contemporary jazz albums.

Three of the songs ("Long 'Bout Midnight", "Here Comes Garfield" and "Up on a Fence") were originally recorded for the soundtrack to Here Comes Garfield, with the former two appearing in the special itself. Two other songs ("Shake Your Paw", "Monday Morning Blues (Blues for Mr. G)") appeared in Garfield Gets a Life, which also used the melody of "Spare Time" for its opening theme.

Critical reception
Rob Theakston of Allmusic rated it 4.5 stars out of 5, saying that "this is a perfect way to not only introduce children to many of these musical styles but to do so in an extremely fun atmosphere."

Track listing

Credits 
 Anas Allaf – engineer, assistant engineer
 Ken Allardyce – engineer
 Carl Anderson – vocals, performer
 Andy Baltimore – creative director
 David Benoit – synthesizer, bass, piano, strings, arrangements, vocals, clavier, brass, performer, string director
 Brad Cole – synthesizer, arrangements, keyboards, programming, associate producer, keyboard arrangements
 Natalie Cole – vocals
 Cal David – guitar
 Jim Davis – liner notes
 Denise DeCaro – backing vocalist
 Frank DeCaro – coordination, management
 Digital Allstars – keyboards, programming
 Joseph Doughney – digital editing, post-production, digital editing assistant
 Marcel East – arrangements, drums, bass, producer (track 8), engineer, drum programming, bass synthesizer, percussion programming
 Nathan East – bass guitar
 André Fischer – arrangements, producer (except track eight)
 Carol Freeman – photography
 David Gibb – graphic design
 Khaliq Glover – engineer
 Josiah Gluck – engineer
 Desirée Goyette – vocals
 Carl Griffin – assistant executive producer, executive associate
 Dave Grusin – executive producer
 Guido Harari – photography
 Tshlene Henreid – production assistant, assistant producer
 Steve Holroyd – engineer
 Jean Marie Horvath – engineer, assistant engineer
 Marc Hugenberger – arrangements, keyboards, programming, associate producer, keyboard arrangements
 Jim Hughart – electric upright bass
 Mike Humphrey – photography
 Clydene Jackson – backing vocalist
 Paul Jasmin – photography
 Alison Jefferson – assistant production coordination
 Ted Jensen – mastering
 Scott Johnson – graphic design
 B. B. King – guitar, vocals, overdubs
 Patti LaBelle – vocals
 Michael Landy – digital editing, post-production
 Michelle Lewis – production coordination
 Randy Long – programming, engineer, assistant engineer
 Sal Marquez – trumpet
 Richard McKernan – engineer
 Sonny Mediana – graphic design
 Lorenzo Music – vocals, voice of Garfield
 N Sisters – backing vocalist
 Valerie Pinkston – vocals
 The Pointer Sisters – vocals
 Lou Rawls – vocals
 Bill Reichenbach Jr. – trombone
 Matthew Rolston – photography
 Larry Rosen – executive producer
 Andy Ruggirello – graphic design
 Bonnie Schiffman – photography
 Diane Schuur – vocals
 Tom Scott – saxophone
 Dan Serrano – graphic design
 Allen Sides – engineer, mixing
 Larry Steelman – arranger, keyboards, programming, associate producer, keyboard arrangements
 The Temptations – vocals
 Carmen Twillie – backing vocalist
 Carlos Vega – drums
 Larry Washington – cymbals
 Carol Weinberg – photography
 Jeffrey "Woody" Woodruff – recorder, engineer, mixing

References 

Garfield mass media and merchandise
Television soundtracks
1991 soundtrack albums
GRP Records soundtracks
Rhythm and blues soundtracks
Jazz soundtracks